"Tall Cool One" is a 1959 instrumental song by The Wailers.

Background
The tune had originally been called "Scotch on the Rocks", but foreseeing problems with teen audiences, Golden Crest Records changed it to "Tall Cool One".

Chart performance
A moderate success in 1959, the song was re-released in 1964 and entered the Top 100 a second time, charting as well as the first time around at 38.

Chart history

Chart history

References

1959 songs
1964 singles
Rock instrumentals
The Fabulous Wailers songs